Smeaton is a  rural town in the state of Victoria, Australia, near the town of Creswick.

The  found that of the 231 population, 117 were male, and 115 were female. Their median age was 53, compared to the national median of 38.  A breakdown of resident heritage showed that 21.3% claimed Australian heritage, 31.5% English heritage, 12.7% Scottish, 9.3% Irish and 4.6% Italian.  However, 79.7% of residents were born in Australia; the only other responses for country of birth were England 2.6%, New Zealand 1.8% and Croatia 1.8%.  The most common response for religion was "No Religion" (26.6%).

The town was founded by Scottish settler Captain John Hepburn who was a colonial squatter in the 1840s. Hepburn held under Government licence about 20,000 acres (80 km²) for his sheep and cattle run which he drove overland from Sydney.  He built Smeaton House in 1849 with the assistance of British colonial migrants.

Smeaton House itself, remains a large and grand reminder of the power and wealth of the few members of the then ruling squattocracy of colonial pre-gold rush Victoria with its grand servants wings and family accommodation and remains in private hands.

Hepburn became a very high-profile figure in the district, promoted gold mines and became a Justice of the Peace before he died in 1860.  The death of Capt John Hepburn was published in the Creswick Newspaper and Argus (Age) Newspapers of that period.

Smeaton Post Office opened on 21 June 1860 and closed in 1993.

Smeaton, in colonial times was once home to seven hotels, two bakeries, two banks and various shops.  Now only the Smeaton Hotel, known as The Cumberland remains of the shopping area providing locals and travellers alike a cold drink, and a warm meal. Anderson's Mill was constructed in 1861-2 by John Anderson to mill flour and later oats.

The local Primary School which opened in 1861, succumbed to dwindling student numbers and closed at the end of the 2013 school year in December 

Smeaton is now home to two large seed and grain processors, one of which is a very large exporter of value added pulses, grains and seeds and is currently building a new oat mill to process an additional 60,000 tonne of oats a year.

A local online newsletter and blog, run by the local community, with information and photos of the town's  and more recent events, can be found online.

References

Towns in Victoria (Australia)